Milwaukee Repertory Theater ("Milwaukee Rep") is a theater company in Milwaukee, Wisconsin. Founded as the Fred Miller Theatre Company, the group is housed in the Patty & Jay Baker Theater Complex, which includes the Quadracci Powerhouse Theater, the Stiemke Studio, and the Stackner Cabaret. Milwaukee Rep produces an annual production of A Christmas Carol at the Pabst Theater. It serves an annual audience of over 200,000 patrons, including over 15,000 subscribers.

History 
After being established as the Fred Miller Theatre Company, the name was changed to Milwaukee Repertory Theater in the late 1950s, to reflect its growing catalogue of classic and contemporary plays, and a commitment to develop the resident acting community. In 1968, it moved from its original space—the Fred Miller Theatre, on Oakland Ave.—to the Todd Wehr Theater at the Performing Art Center in downtown Milwaukee. In 1974, a small warehouse was converted into the experimental Court Street Theater, which served as a laboratory for creative exploration and a testing ground for new playwrights. Milwaukee Repertory Theater moved to its current location in 1987 and closed its Court Street operations. The theater is now located on the east bank of the Milwaukee River in the Patty and Jay Baker Theater Complex at 108 E Wells St, Milwaukee, Wisconsin.

Milwaukee Repertory Theater is dedicated to presenting new playwrights, reliving classics, and commissioning translations of classic and contemporary foreign playwrights. Each year, Milwaukee Rep welcomes up to 275,000 people at nearly 700 performances of 15 productions ranging from compelling dramas, powerful classics, new plays and full-scale musicals in its three unique performance venues. Since 1958, Milwaukee Repertory Theater has premiered nearly 150 plays and musicals. Historically the theater has put on annual holiday productions of Charles Dickens' A Christmas Carol at the historic Pabst Theater since 1976. In 2012, Milwaukee Rep recorded a deficit of nearly $400,000, despite an increase in total ticket revenue of 60% from the previous season. Coming out of the recession, Milwaukee Rep refined its budget, increased ticket sales, and received a single donation of half a million dollars helping to pay down the accumulated deficit from past seasons.

Theater spaces 
 720-seat Quadracci Powerhouse Thrust Stage
 186-seat Stackner Cabaret Theater, bar, and restaurant 
 205-seat Stiemke Studio

World premieres 
The Last Days of a Young Man by James Andrews (1958)
Adam the Creator by Ray Boyle and Sam Lawent (1960)
Tartuffe translated by Richard Wilbur from the play by Molière (1962)
All Together Now by Nagle Jackson, Jeffrey Tambor, and Milwaukee Repertory Theater Company (1972)
An Occasional Piece Suitable to the Openings of Theaters by Nagle Jackson (1973)
Fighting Bob by Tom Cole (1979)
How I Got That Story by Amlin Gray (1979) 
Lakeboat by David Mamet (1980)
The Nerd by Larry Shue (1981)
The Foreigner by Larry Shue (1984)
Work Song by Eric Simonson and Jeffrey Hatcher (2000)
The Bachelors by Fred Alley and James Kaplan (2001)
Moby Dick adapted by Eric Simonson (2002)
Winter Wonderettes by Roger Bean (2003) 
Bach at Leipzig by Itamar Moses (2004) 
Sherlock Holmes: The Final Adventure by Steven Dietz (2005) 
Holmes and Watson: A Musical Mystery by Jahnna Beecham and Malcom Hilgartner (2009) 
Soultime at the Apollo by Kevin Ramsey (2009) 
Liberace! by Brent Hazelton (2010) 
after all the terrible things I do by A. Rey Pamatmat (2014) 
Back Home Again: On The Road with John Denver by Randal Myler and Dan Wheetman (2015)
Five Presidents by Rick Cleveland (2015) 
American Song by Joanna Murray-Smith (2016)
Sirens of Song by Kevin Ramsey (2016)
A Christmas Carol adapted by Mark Clements (2016) 
Mark Twain’s River of Song by Randal Myler and Dan Wheetman (2018)
One House Over by Catherine Trieschmann (2018)
Antonio’s Song / I Was Dreaming of a Son by Dael Orlandersmith (2021)
New Age by Dael Orlandersmith (2021)

Notable artists 
 Ayad Akhtar - playwright of Disgraced, The Who and The What
 Marc Alaimo - member of the Rep's Company (1967—1970)
 Anthony Crivello - starred in McGuire
 Carmen Cusazck - cast in Ragtime
 Dick Enberg - wrote McGuire
 Gordon Gano
 Tom Hulce - Romeo and Juliet 1978-79 season
 Judith Light - member of the Rep
 David Mamet - playwright, Lakeboat first premiered at the Rep
 Rita Moreno - actress at Fred Miller Theater
 Chris Noth - starred in The Torch 1988-89 season
 Larry Shue - member of The Rep
 Erika Slezak - member of the Rep’s Company
 Jeffrey Tambor - three seasons at the Rep (1971—75) 
 Betty White - actress at Fred Miller Theater

Community involvement
Milwaukee Rep's community programs include student matinées, facility tours, residencies, and in-school workshops. It contributes complimentary tickets to Milwaukee area non-profit fund-raisers. Milwaukee Rep also sponsors adult acting classes, public lectures and discussions, pre-show "The Rep-In-Depth" presentations in the Quadracci Powerhouse and Stiemke Studio, and audience talk-backs. Additional patron features include "pay-what-you-can" performances, audio described performances, American Sign Language-interpreted performances, captioned performances and numerous special events including Opening Night and Closing Night parties. The Friends of Milwaukee Repertory Theater is its official volunteer organization.

Milwaukee Rep is also home to one of the oldest internship programs in regional theater. Each season acting, directing, and production interns join the company full-time to gain experience in professional theater. Mark Clements is the current Artistic Director and Chad Bauman is the current Executive Director.

References

External links 
Milwaukee Repertory Theater web site
Milwaukee Repertory Theater Photographic History
Charity Navigator: Milwaukee Repertory Theater, Mission

Theatre companies in Milwaukee
Theatres in Milwaukee